Trinitarian commonly refers to ideas or things pertaining to the Trinity.

Trinitarian may also refer to:

Trinitarianism, a Christian doctrine
Trinitarian Order, a Roman Catholic mendicant order founded in 1198 by St. John of Matha
A member of Trinity College, Cambridge
A member of Trinity College, Oxford